Serhiy Borysovych Bessarab (born 13 November 1955) is a Soviet and Ukrainian lieutenant general. He served as a troop commander of the Territorial Directorate "North" (2005–2007), the First Deputy Commander of the Ukrainian Ground Forces (2012–2015), and the Deputy Chief of the General Staff of the Ukrainian Armed Forces (2015–2020). On 4 March 2020, he was appointed as the Minister for Veterans Affairs of Ukraine in the Shmyhal Government. He resigned due to ill health on 16 December 2020.

Biography 
In 1977, Bessarab graduated from Kyiv Higher Combined-Arms Command School, and in 1990 graduated from the M. V. Frunze Military Academy in Moscow. Later, in 2002, he also graduated from National Defense University of Ukraine.

Since May 2012 - First Deputy Commander of the Land Forces of the Armed Forces of Ukraine.

Since 2015, he has been the commander of the ATO. According to volunteer Vitaliy Deynega, the new commander forbade Ukrainian soldiers in the ATO zone to respond to militants' artillery attacks with artillery fire.

From March 4 to December 15, 2020, he was the Minister of Veterans Affairs of Ukraine.

References

External links 
 Serhiy Bessarab. Government of Ukraine website

1955 births
Living people
People from Dnipropetrovsk Oblast
Frunze Military Academy alumni
Ivan Chernyakhovsky National Defense University of Ukraine alumni
21st-century Ukrainian politicians
Lieutenant generals of Ukraine
Independent politicians in Ukraine
Veterans affairs ministers of Ukraine